Thomas William Marley (13 May 1850 – 14 July 1923), chairman and managing director of the North Brancepeth Coal Co. Ltd., a noted amateur genealogist, and author of a 1919 monograph "The question of the Nationalisation of the Mines". Thomas was the second son of a family of 2 boys and 6 girls of Thomas Marley and Jane Margaret Rayne. He was the nephew of the mining engineer John Marley. Many of his genealogy papers and notebooks are stored by the Northumberland Archives.

Siblings

 George (b. 1 April 1842)
 Sarah Mary (b. 14 June 1844)
 Frances Ann (b. 17 July 1846)
 Elizabeth Jane (b. 10 November 1848)
 Thomas William (b. 13 May 1850)
 Margaret Ellen (b. 6 August 1852)
 Katherine Jane (b. 12 May 1854)
 Edith Marion (b. 28 March 1856)

References

1850 births
1925 deaths
British businesspeople in the coal industry
20th-century English businesspeople
19th-century English businesspeople